Cape Verde national football team results may refer to:

Cape Verde national football team results (1978–1999)
Cape Verde national football team results (2000–2019)
Cape Verde national football team results (2020–present)